K. Warner Schaie (born February 1, 1928) is an American social gerontologist and psychologist best known for founding the Seattle Longitudinal Study in 1956.

The Seattle Longitudinal Study took a 'life span' approach to aging and cognition, studying subjects from birth through the life course. The aim was to filter out 'cohort effects' and other issues that come from studying mixed groups of people.

Schaie has received numerous awards and honors, including the Kleemeier Award from the Gerontological Society of America, the Award for Distinguished Scientific Contributions from the American Psychological Association, and the Lifetime Career Award from the Mensa Research Foundation

Early life and education
K. Warner Schaie was born in 1928, in Stettin, which was then part of the Weimar Republic and now is part of Poland. He moved to California in 1947 and worked his way through undergraduate school using his skills as a printer. Schaie received his B.A in psychology from the University of California, Berkeley in 1952. He then obtained his M.S. in 1953 in psychology at the University of Washington, Seattle. Schaie finished his education at the University of Washington in 1956 with his Ph.D. in psychology. In his early career he studied the relationship of color and personality.

Career
Schaie has spent much of his career studying the psychological development from young adulthood to old age. He is currently working at the Pennsylvania State University as Evan Pugh Professor Emeritus of Human Development and Psychology. He is an Affiliate Professor of Psychiatry and Behavioral Sciences at the University of Washington. His current research encompasses an interest in the life course of adult intelligence, the impact of cognitive behavior in midlife and the integrity of brain structures in old age, and early detection of risk for dementia. Schaie also studies developmental research methodology in addition to the applications of the age-cohort-period model to psychology. Schaie is the author and or editor of 60 books and 300 journal articles and chapters on the psychology of aging. Schaie is also known for his contributions to testing literature such as the Test of Behavioral Rigidity and the Schaie-Thurstone Test of Adult Mental Abilities.

Contributions
Schaie is most well known for his involvement in the Seattle Longitudinal study. The research that Schaie conducted in the field of geropsychology has resulted in changes in public policy such as raising the mandatory retirement ages from 65 to 70  in many  fields. Now millions of individuals have the option of remaining employed as they age into their sixties and seventies. With the results from the Seattle Longitudinal Study, Schaie has challenged earlier models of cognitive aging.

Death
Klaus Warner Schaie, age 95, of Seattle, Washington passed away on Tuesday, February 7, 2023

References

External links
 K. Warner Schaie faculty website
 The Seattle Longitudinal Study
 Klaus Schaie Obituary

1928 births
21st-century American psychologists
American gerontologists
Living people
German emigrants to the United States
University of California, Berkeley alumni
University of Washington alumni
Pennsylvania State University faculty
20th-century American psychologists